= Niponostenostola lineata =

Scientific classification
- Domain: Eukaryota
- Kingdom: Animalia
- Phylum: Arthropoda
- Class: Insecta
- Order: Coleoptera
- Suborder: Polyphaga
- Infraorder: Cucujiformia
- Family: Cerambycidae
- Genus: Niponostenostola
- Species: N. lineata

Binomial name
- Niponostenostola lineata (Gressitt, 1951)

Synonyms
- Eumecocera lineata (Gressitt, 1963); Stenostola lineata Gressitt, 1963

Species of beetle

Niponostenostola lineata is a species of beetle in the family Cerambycidae. It is known from China.
